The Hamptons is a quiet, well maintained residential neighbourhood in west Edmonton, Alberta, Canada.

It is bounded on the west by Winterburn Road, on the east by 199 Street NW and on the south by 45 Avenue NW. The north boundary is south of 56 Avenue NW. The Anthony Henday provides access to destinations to the south of the city including the Edmonton International Airport and to the north including the City of St Albert.

The Hamptons is a quiet, well maintained, fairly new neighbourhood in west Edmonton. According to the Homeowners Association, there are 1,374 residences in the neighbourhood, of which 73% are single-family dwellings and 27% are duplexes. Nearly all the residences were owner occupied.

This quiet community is represented by The Hamptons South East Edmonton Homeowners Association as well as The Hamptons Community League.

Demographics 

Surrounding neighbourhoods

See also 
 Edmonton Federation of Community Leagues

References

External links 
 The Hamptons Neighbourhood Profile

Neighbourhoods in Edmonton